Hu Henghua (born June 1963) is a Chinese politician currently serving as deputy party secretary and mayor of Chongqing. He is an alternate member of the 19th Central Committee of the Chinese Communist Party. He was a representative of the 17th and 18th National Congress of the Chinese Communist Party and a deputy to the 12th National People's Congress.

Early life and education
Hu was born in Hengnan County, Hunan, in June 1963. He graduated from Xi'an University of Architecture and Technology and Hunan University.

Career in Hunan
He entered the workforce in July 1983, and joined the Chinese Communist Party in June 1985. Beginning in 1983, he served in several posts in Hengyang Steel Pipe Factory, including workshop director, deputy factory director, and general manager. He began his political career in July 2005, when he was appointed director and party branch secretary of Hunan Provincial Economic Commission. In March 2008, he was named acting mayor and deputy party secretary of Yiyang, replacing Ma Yong. In January 2001, he was appointed director and party branch secretary of Hunan Provincial Development and Reform Commission.

He became acting mayor of Changsha, the capital city under the jurisdiction of Hunan province, in December 2013, and was installed in January 2014. He concurrently served as deputy party secretary of Changsha and secretary of the Party Working Committee of Xiangjiang New Area. In November 2016, he was admitted to member of the standing committee of the CPC Hunan Provincial Committee, the province's top authority. One month later, he was appointed director of Hunan Provincial State Owned Assets Supervision and Administration Commission. In July 2017, he was promoted to party secretary of Changsha, the top political position in the city, concurrently holding the position of first secretary of CPC Changsha Garrison Command Committee.

Career in Shaanxi
In October 2020, he was transferred to northwest China's Shaanxi province and appointed deputy party secretary.

Career in Chongqing
In December 2021, he was appointed deputy party secretary of Chongqing, succeeding Tang Liangzhi. On December 31, he was named acting mayor of Chongqing.

References

1963 births
Living people
People from Hengnan County
Xi'an University of Architecture and Technology alumni
Hunan University alumni
People's Republic of China politicians from Hunan
Chinese Communist Party politicians from Hunan
Alternate members of the 19th Central Committee of the Chinese Communist Party
Members of the 20th Central Committee of the Chinese Communist Party
Deputy Communist Party secretaries of Shaanxi